Libor Polášek (born April 22, 1974) is a retired Czech professional ice hockey centre. He has been described by some Vancouver Canucks fans and journalists as one of the worst first-round draft picks made by that NHL team.

Playing career 
The Canucks selected Polasek ahead of their next selection Michael Peca (who played more than 860 NHL regular-season games). The team hoped that the tall (6’4") Czech center would develop into a Mark Messier-like player. Instead, Polasek had difficulty making an impact even at the minor-league level.

He scored a total of just 18 goals over two seasons (1992–1994) playing with the Hamilton Canucks farm team in the AHL. In the AHL playoffs in 1993–94, he scored no goals in three games during Hamilton’s four-games first-round loss to Cornwall.

After a goal-less seven-game stint in the ECHL in 1994–95, he returned to the AHL with the new Canuck affiliate Syracuse Crunch and scored just two goals in 45 games. In 1995–96, he played 19 games in the Czech league then returned to the Crunch for eight more goal-less games. He returned to Europe and in almost a decade of playing for Czech and Slovak teams he scored just 41 goals from 1996–97 to 2005–06.

Performance reception 
According to CNNSI.com’s 2001 profile of Canuck draft busts, "Polasek fared worse than the previous three (first-round busts Dan Woodley, Jason Herter and Alek Stojanov) combined -- he never played in an NHL game. In fact, one is hard-pressed to even find statistics on Polasek in many hockey annals."

The Vancouver Sun’s Iain MacIntyre also wrote in 2001 that if "nuclear winter" set in due to the Canuck draft record in the 80s, then the team "detonated the H-bomb on themselves in 1992 in the form of Libor Polasek, who soon vanished. Not so the Canucks' reputation for picking more duds than CBS programmers."

Career statistics

Regular season and playoffs

International

See also 
List of AHL seasons

References

External links 

1974 births
Living people
Sportspeople from Nový Jičín
Czechoslovak ice hockey centres
Czech ice hockey centres
Hamilton Canucks players
HC Košice players
HC Plzeň players
HC Slavia Praha players
HC Slezan Opava players
HC Vítkovice players
VHK Vsetín players
MsHK Žilina players
National Hockey League first-round draft picks
South Carolina Stingrays players
Syracuse Crunch players
Vancouver Canucks draft picks
Czech expatriate ice hockey players in Canada
Czech expatriate ice hockey players in the United States
Czech expatriate ice hockey players in Sweden
Czech expatriate ice hockey players in Slovakia